Vinod Naranat is an Indian ventriloquist, puppeteer and puppet-maker.

Life
Naranat, who hails from Ernakulam, began his career as a magician. After a meeting with ventriloquist Prahaladacharya in 1987, he chose to pursue a career as ventriloquist.

"Kitty", Naranat's monkey puppet, is talking to spectators with jokes and naughty comments to interact with people. Kitty became popular, after its creator Naranat took up social issues. To create awareness among the public, the government and non-government organizations are using Kitty shows as a tool. Several corporate business organizations are also using Kitty shows for the promotion of their products and services.

References 

Ventriloquists
Indian magicians
Living people
Year of birth missing (living people)